Irina Igorevna Nusinova (born 17 September 1982), better known by her stage name Irson Kudikova, is a Russian pop singer, model, saxophonist, music producer, and actress. She was a contestant in the Russian television music competition, Star Factory-5.

In 2005, Kudikova had a photo shoot for Maxim magazine. Some of her music is featured in the Dolph Lundgren film Command Performance.

Biography and career

Early years
Kudikova was born on 17 September 1982 in Moscow. When she was a child she had finished music school under the violin. Also during her attendance she was a "master of sports" in basketball and made the Russian Olympic Reserve.

Career
When Kudikova was 15, she was invited to be the soloist for the group "Children of vinil" with the support of Alexander Tsekalo.  She first realized she had a career at being a vocalist after singing in a duet at a concert. She received a thunderous applause from the audience for her performance.

After the discovery of Kudikova's voice, she had decided to start a career as a professional variety singer. She has received voice training from some of the best vocal teachers and has found a fondness for playing the saxophone and piano.

Factory of stars
In 2004, Kudikova was a participant in the teleproject "Alla Pugacheva's Star Factory-5". She gained popularity to a wider audience after singing the song "Why" in her first performance in the competition.

Some of the songs performed by Kudikova during "Alla Pugacheva's Star Factory-5" became hits, for instance: "By Long evenings" and "Forgive me". Kudikova performed in duets with other competitors, such as; Alla Pugacheva ("I will place all on the places"), Sergey Mazayev ("the Actress on life"), Alexander Malinin ("As we loved"), Verka Serdjuchka, Vladimir Presnyakov, Pierre Nartsiss, Anastasia Stotskaya and others. Kudikova recorded some joint compositions with the world stars Tomas N'evergreen, ("Another lovesong"), and Al Bano ("Ci Sara").

Cooperation with Alla Pugacheva
Kudikova gives credit to Alla Pugacheva for being the person who changed her life. Now, Pugacheva is her art director and her mentor. Kudikova believes she owes everything to Alla Borisovne; "the Prima donna helped me to begin a career on the big scene and has always supported me, like nobody else."

Cooperation with Igor Matvienko 

After Kudikova's termination from the teleproject "Alla Pugacheva's Star Factory-5" she signed a contract with Igor Matvienko's music production company and the First Channel.

In May 2007, Kudikova's had a big solo concert in Moscow under the name "Irson Jazz Show". Some stars from the jazz, variety and comedy scene also took part in the concert program. In 2009, Kudikova—while in Los Angeles—made the acquaintance of Snoop Dogg, their meeting led to her being featured in a track of his "Replay".

Irson Production
In 2010, Kudikova founded her own company "Irson Production", allowing her to take the independent route for her career.
 
In 2011, Kudikova recorded a duet with American rapper Warren G called "Innocent".

Sports
Kudikova is a "master of sports" in Russia for basketball and a candidate for a "master of sports" in table tennis.

Hobby
Kudikova has a fondness for sports and has a long list of activities that she regularly enjoys. She loves to water ski, play tennis—and table tennis--, sky dives, swimming, track and field athletics, rhythmic gymnastics, ballet, volleyball, and even equestrian sports. She also professionally drives cars and motorcycles, she has even finished courses for professional drivers/bodyguards.

Business
Kudikova currently owns the jewelry company "Golden heart" and her personal entertainment company "Irson Productions".  She also was a joint owner of the security enterprise "International League of Professional Bodyguards".

Discography
"Two stars""(2008)
"Shoppingtherapy" (2008)
"Point G" (2009)
"Point G, Part 2" (2010)
"Irson Kudikova" (2010)
"Dreams On" (2010)

Clips
"September Rain" (Ost fikm Dangerous tour (Command Performance)), director Feodor Bondarchuk (2006)
"Space" (in a leading role of Dolph Lundgren), director Yury Grymov (2006)
"Shoppingtherepy", director Ekaterina Grohovsky (2008)
"Whether you, whether he" (feat. Andrey Zvonky), director Pavel Khudyakov (2010)
"I will make everything as you want" (2011)

Filmography
"Dangerous tour" ("Command Performance") – The jazz singer (2009)

References

External links

Irson Kudikova official website

1982 births
Living people
Russian female models
Russian pop singers
Singers from Moscow
Russian record producers
Fabrika Zvyozd
21st-century Russian singers
21st-century Russian women singers
Women record producers